Luca Zanforlin (born March 4, 1965) is an Italian television presenter.

Biography
Zanforlin was born in Ferrara. He is the creator and host (with Maria De Filippi) of the talent show Amici di Maria De Filippi (Canale 5).

Television
Ore 12 – with Gerry Scotti
Perdonami – with Davide Mengacci
Iva Show – with Iva Zanicchi
Una goccia nel mare – with Mara Venier
30 ore per la vita – with Lorella Cuccarini and Marco Columbro
Il brutto anatroccolo – with Amanda Lear
Meteore – with Gene Gnocchi
Bigodini
Tempo di Musica
Un'italiana per Miss Universo – with Elenoire Casalegno
Super – with Elenoire Casalegno
Testarda io – with Iva Zanicchi
Popstars
Quantestorie
Amici di Maria De Filippi
Nokia Amici in Tour

Books
A un passo dal sogno. Il romanzo di Amici, Segrate, Arnoldo Mondadori Editore, 2007. 
Fra il cuore e le stelle, Segrate, Arnoldo Mondadori Editore, 2008. 
Vola via con me. Il nuovo romanzo di Amici, Segrate, Arnoldo Mondadori Editore, 2009. 
Testa o cuore. Il romanzo di Amici, Segrate, Arnoldo Mondadori Editore, 2011. 
Denise la cozza, Segrate, Arnoldo Mondadori Editore, 2011. 
Molto più che Amici, Segrate, Arnoldo Mondadori Editore, 2012.
Se ci credi davvero, Segrate, Arnaldo Mondadori Editore, 2013.

See also
Maria De Filippi
Mediaset
Telecinco

References

External links 
 Amici di Maria de Filippi

1965 births
Living people
Italian television presenters
People from Ferrara